Kate McTell (born Ruthy Kate Williams; August 22, 1911 – October 3, 1991) was an American blues musician and nurse from Jefferson County, Georgia. She is known primarily as the former wife of the blues musician Blind Willie McTell, whom she accompanied vocally on several recordings. She may have recorded as Ruby Glaze, but there is some uncertainty about whether she and Glaze were the same person, despite the fact that she claimed to be Glaze.

Early life and marriage to Blind Willie McTell
Ruthy (later changed to Ruth) Kate Williams  was born in Savannah, Georgia. She was singing for a high-school ceremony in Augusta, Georgia, in 1933 when she was noticed by McTell, who regularly performed in the area. In an interview conducted by the musicologist David Evans and his family, she stated that she and Willie met at a Christmas concert at her school in 1931. She went on to explain that Willie invited her to record with him, that they did so in Atlanta over the course of a week, and that she then returned to Augusta to continue her schooling at Paine College. According to Michael Gray, that week of recording would have been in February 1932. The McTells were married on January 11, 1934. For the next six years she often accompanied Willie on stage, singing or dancing, in performances in Chicago, Atlanta and elsewhere, and in the company of artists such as Louis Armstrong and Bessie Smith. The two were invited to record for Decca Records by executive Mayo Williams in 1935, but the recordings from these sessions had extremely limited releases. In late June 1936, they recorded 12 blues songs with Piano Red for Vocalion Records.

In 1939, she obtained a nursing certificate from Grady Hospital in Atlanta, and from 1942 until 1971 she was an army nurse at Fort Gordon hospital, near Augusta. As Willie lived in Atlanta for his career, the two rarely saw each other and drifted apart. Much of what is known about her husband comes from the interview she gave with the Evans family, published in Blues Unlimited magazine in 1977.

After his death
Ten years after her husband's death in 1959, she married Johnny E. Seabrooks, who was in the military. They had two children, Ernest and April. She retired from the hospital in 1971. After Seabrooks died in 1976, she lived a fairly private life, except for interviews she gave in 1977, 1979, and 1981 about Willie McTell. She died in Augusta, Georgia, on October 3, 1991.

As Ruby Glaze
There is some uncertainty as to whether Ruby Glaze, a singer with whom Willie McTell recorded in 1932, is the same person as Kate McTell. In an interview conducted in the 1970s, she claimed that she was Glaze. The uncertainty stems from confusion over when she first met Willie and whether or not this was after he had recorded with Glaze. Bruce Bastin gave the year of their meeting as 1931, at her graduation from Paine College, in Augusta, Georgia, and stated that immediately afterward she went on to Washington High in Atlanta, which is where and when Willie recorded with Glaze. Bastin also noted the similarities between Glaze's spoken parts in "Searching the Desert for the Blues" and the ones in the McTells' recording of "Ticket Agent Blues" in 1935. As mentioned above, McTell told the musicologist David Evans and his family that she had met Willie in late 1931 and that they recorded soon afterward over the course of a week. Gray placed this recording in February 1932. Some sources have claimed that McTell and Glaze are the same person, while others have claimed that they are not.

Discography
Kate McTell appears on a small number of albums, generally accompanying her husband on vocals.
 Blind Willie McTell 1927–1949 (Willie McTell)
 Mississippi-Memphis-Chicago Blues (various artists)
  The Essential (Willie McTell)
 Gospel, Vol. 3: Guitar Evangelists and Bluesmen 1927–1944 (various artists)
 Le Gospel 1939–1952 (various artists), containing a solo track, "Dying Gambler"

Other information
She is referred to in a blues song, "Blind Willie", by Hans Theessink, in the lyric "Ruthy Kate leading Willie by the hand".

Citations

References
Bastin, B. Red River Blues: The Blues Tradition in the Southeast. 1986. Illini Books. . Retrieved 2011-09-22.
Gray, M. Hand Me My Travelin' Shoes: In Search of Blind Willie McTell. 2007. Bloomsbury Publishing, London. . Retrieved 2011-09-22.

Further reading

Printed publications
Evans, David (1977). "Kate McTell". Blues Unlimited 125 (July/August 1977), pp. 8–16; 127 (November/December 1977),  pp. 20–22. .
Read, Jill (1981). “Kate McTell Remembers: One Travelin’ Man and the Blues". Athens Observer, 29 January 1981. .

External links

1911 births
1991 deaths
American blues singers
20th-century American singers